Königstein may refer to:

Germany 
 Königstein im Taunus, a town in Hesse
 Königstein, Saxony
 Königstein Fortress, near Königstein, Saxony
 Königstein (hill), an elevation on which the fortress sits
 Königstein, Bavaria
 Königstein (Westerhausen), a hill near Westerhausen, Saxony-Anhalt
 Königstein Railway

Namibia
 Königstein, Namibia, highest mountain in Namibia

Romania
 Piatra Craiului Mountains, called Königstein by local Germans (Transylvanian Saxons)